Julius Margolin (October 14, 1900 – January 21, 1971) was a Russian Empire-born Israeli writer and political activist. He was the author of A Journey to the Land Ze-Ka (Путешествие в страну Зэ-Ка).

Biography
Margolin was born in Pinsk, Russian Empire. He studied at the Humboldt University of Berlin. Margolin received his doctorate in philosophy in 1929. He then moved to Łódź, Poland, and later, in 1936, to Palestine. Three years later he was visiting his relatives in Pinsk and was trapped there by the Soviet invasion of Poland. Together with numerous other "socially dangerous elements", he was rounded up by the NKVD and sent to a labor camp on the northern bank of the Lake Onega. He survived, and was freed in 1945 as a former Polish citizen according to the agreement with Poland. In 1946, he was permitted to return to Poland. He emigrated to Palestine, settling in Tel Aviv.

Literary career
He completed A Journey to the Land Ze-Ka in 1947, when Aleksandr Solzhenitsyn had just been sent to the gulag. It was impossible to publish such a book about the Soviet Union in the West at that time, immediately after World War II. The manuscript was also rejected by publishers in Israel. An abridged version was published in France in  1949.

In 1951, Margolin testified at the  trial of David Rousset, who was accused of revealing information about the gulag to the French public.

Published works
1949 - Margoline Jules. La condition inhumaine. Cinq ans dans les camps de concentration Sovietiques Traduit par N. Berberova & Mina Journot. Novembre 1949. Calmann-Levi, Editeurs, Paris.
1952 - Марголин Ю. Б. "Путешествие в страну зэ-ка", 414 стр. Chekhov Publishing House, New York
Reprinted several times in various places
1965 - Julius Margolin Uberleben ist alles. Aufzeichnungen aus sowietischen Lagern, Munchen,
Separate chapters from the book were also published in various magazines.
2010 - Julius Margolin, Voyage au pays des Ze-Ka. The first complete edition (more than 1/3 of the text had never been published before in any language). Edited by Luba Jurgenson. October 2010, Le Bruit du temps, Paris. More information here.
2013 - Reise in das Land der Lager. Suhrkamp Verlag, November 2013, .
2013 - Julius Margolin, "Podróż do krainy zeków", translated by Jerzy Czech, Czarne publishing house,

See also
In the Claws of the GPU, a Gulag memoir by a citizen of interwar Poland, published in 1935.

References

External links
Forgotten Witness to the Gulag
Путешествие в страну зэ-ка A Travel to the Land Ze-Ka, as published in the book 
A Travel to the Land Ze-Ka, 2005, full text, according to the original manuscript (Part I was skipped in print)  (KOI8-R encoding)

1900 births
1971 deaths
Writers from Pinsk
People from Pinsky Uyezd
Jews from the Russian Empire
Belarusian Jews
Polish emigrants to Mandatory Palestine
Foreign Gulag detainees
Israeli non-fiction writers
Jewish Gulag detainees
20th-century non-fiction writers